The 1991–92 NBA season was the Kings' 43rd season in the National Basketball Association, and seventh season in Sacramento. The Kings had the third overall pick in the 1991 NBA draft, and selected Billy Owens out of Syracuse University, but later on traded him to the Golden State Warriors in exchange for Mitch Richmond before the start of the season. The team also acquired Spud Webb from the Atlanta Hawks during the off-season, and traded Bob Hansen to the Chicago Bulls in exchange for Dennis Hopson early into the season. However, their struggles continued as the Kings road losing streak climbed up to 43 consecutive road losses before defeating the Orlando Magic 95–93 at the Orlando Arena on November 23. The Kings would change coaches again firing Dick Motta after a 7–18 start to the season. However, under his replacement Rex Hughes, the Kings went on a 10-game losing streak in March, finishing last place in the Pacific Division with a 29–53 record.

Richmond averaged 22.5 points and 5.1 assists per game, while second-year star Lionel Simmons averaged 17.1 points, 8.1 rebounds, 4.3 assists, 1.7 steals and 1.7 blocks per game, and Wayman Tisdale provided the team with 16.6 points and 6.5 rebounds per game. In addition, Webb contributed 16.0 points, 7.1 assists and 1.6 steals per game, while second-year forward Anthony Bonner provided with 9.4 points and 6.1 rebounds per game, and second-year center Duane Causwell averaged 8.0 points, 7.3 rebounds and 2.7 blocks per game. Following the season, Hopson retired after just five seasons in the NBA.

Draft picks

Roster

Regular season

Season standings

y - clinched division title
x - clinched playoff spot

z - clinched division title
y - clinched division title
x - clinched playoff spot

Record vs. opponents

Game log

Player statistics

NOTE: Please write the players statistics in alphabetical order by last name.

Awards and records

Transactions

References

Sacramento Kings seasons
Sacramento
Sacramento
Sacramento